Turbonillinae is a subfamily of mostly minute parasitic sea snails, marine gastropod molluscs in the family Pyramidellidae, the pyrams and their allies.

This subfamily has been shown to be monophyletic

Taxonomy
In the taxonomy of Schander, Van Aartsen & Corgan (1999) Turbonillinae is a part of the family Turbonillidae.
Family Turbonillidae Bronn, 1849
Subfamily Turbonillinae Bronn, 1849
 Subfamily Cingulininae Saurin, 1958
 Subfamily Eulimellinae Saurin, 1958

According to Schander, Van Aartsen & Corgan (1999) there are 27 genera within the Turbonillinae.

Turbonillinae has been one of eleven recognised subfamilies in the family Pyramidellidae (according to the taxonomy of Ponder & Lindberg, 1997).

In the taxonomy of Bouchet & Rocroi (2005), this subfamily  comprises the subfamilies Cingulininae and Eulimellinae, that have been downgraded to the rank of tribe.
Subfamily Turbonillinae Bronn, 1849
Tribe Turbonillini Bronn, 1849
Tribe Cingulinini Saurin, 1958
Tribe Eulimellini Saurin, 1958

In 2010 the subfamily Turbonillinae has been recognized as monophyletic

Genera
Genera within the subfamily Turbonillinae include:

tribe Turbonillini
 Turbonilla Risso, 1826 - type genus of the subfamily Turbonillinae
 Asmunda Dall & Bartsch, 1904
 Bacteridiella Saurin, 1959
 Bartschella Iredale, 1916
 Bouchetmella Peñas & Rolán, 2016
 Careliopsis Mörch, 1875
 Cylindroturbonilla Nordsieck, 1972
 Ebalina Thiele, 1929
 Exesilla Laseron, 1959
 Gispyrella Laws, 1937
 Graciliturbonilla Nordsieck, 1972
 Houbrickia Wise, 1996
 Lancea Peace, 1868
 Magniturbonilla Nordsieck, 1972
 Mormula A. Adams, 1863
 Nisiturris Dall & Bartsch, 1906
 Paramormula Nomura, 1939
 Paraturbonilla Boettger, 1906
 Planpyrgiscus Laws, 1937
 Pselliogyra Dall & Bartsch, 1909 : synonym of Parthenina Bucquoy, Dautzenberg & Dollfus, 1883
 Puposyrnola Cossmann, 1921
 Pyrgiscilla Laws, 1937
 Pyrgiscus Philippi, 1841
 Pyrgolampros Sacco, 1892
 Pyrgolidium Monterosato, 1884
 Striarcana Laws, 1937
 Sulcoturbonilla Sacco, 1892
 Tereoturbonilla Eames, 1951
 Turbolidium Robba, 2013 
 Zaphella Laseron, 1959: synonym of Asmunda Dall & Bartsch, 1904

tribe Cingulinini

tribe Eulimellini

tribe ?
 Kleinella A. Adams, 1860

Genera brought into synonymy:
 Amamimormula Kuroda, 1928: synonym of Turbonilla Risso, 1826
 Baldra' Dall & Bartsch, 1904: synonym of Turbonilla Risso, 1826

Problematic genera within the family Turbonillinae
The following genera were difficult to place within the subfamily Turbonillinae (= Turbonillini + Cingulinini + Eulimellini):

 Atomiscala DeBoury, 1909
 Atomiscala islandica Warén, 1989
 Hamarilla Eames & Wilkins, 1957
 Pseudographis Mifsud, 1998: synonym of Kejdonia Mifsud, 1999 
 Rissopsetia Dell, 1956
 Rissopsetia hummelincki Faber, 1984
 Rissopsetia islandica Warén, 1989

The genus Ebala'' was previously placed in the Eulimellinae, but was then placed in the family Ebalidae, that is a synonym of Murchisonellidae.

Distribution
This family is found worldwide.

Shell description
The shell of these snails has a blunt, heterostrophic protoconch, which is pointed sideways. The shell of most species are rather high and slender.

The texture of these shells is usually ribbed sculptured in various forms and often also have more or less prominent spirals. Their color is mostly white, cream or yellowish, sometimes with red or brown lines.

The adult shell, the teleoconch is dextrally coiled, but the larval shells are sinistral. This results in a sinistrally coiled protoconch. The opening of the shell, the aperture is closed by a lid, a so called operculum.

Life habits
The Turbonillinae are ectoparasites, feeding mainly on other molluscs and on annelid worms.

They do not have a radula. Instead their long proboscis is used to pierce the skin of its prey and suck up its fluids and soft tissues. The eyes on the grooved tentacles are situated toward the base of the tentacles. Between the head and the foot, a lobed process called the mentum (= thin projection) is visible.

These molluscs are hermaphrodites.

References

Pyramidellidae
Taxa named by Heinrich Georg Bronn